Top is a village and municipality in the Oghuz Rayon of Azerbaijan. It has a population of 370.

References

Populated places in Oghuz District